The Saint-Laurent Railway Bridge is a Canadian Pacific railway bridge linking LaSalle to the Kahnawake Mohawk Reserve, just upstream of the Mercier Bridge. It is used by the RTM
Candiac commuter train.

History of the bridge 
Two bridges have crossed the river at this location. The first bridge, erected in 1885–1887, was of all-steel construction that employed a flying cantilever design to cross the main channel. It carried a single track and was opened for passenger service at the end of July, 1887.

The second structure, the one standing today, was constructed between 1910 and 1913 and was completed by November 13, 1913. To build the bridge, the free ends of the main spans were floated across the water on a barge.  Construction of the new bridge was completed while keeping the old bridge in service.  Extra piers were added and the design changed significantly.

Construction of the Saint Lawrence Seaway required the construction of twin vertical lift bridges replacing the existing fixed spans.

Gallery

See also 
List of crossings of the Saint Lawrence River
List of bridges in Montreal
List of bridges in Canada

References 

Railway bridges in Quebec
Canadian Pacific Railway bridges in Canada
Bridges over the Saint Lawrence River
Bridges completed in 1886
Rail transport in Montérégie
Bridges in Montérégie
Vertical lift bridges in Canada